This is a list of all the champions of the mixed doubles event for the Australian Open tennis tournament.

Champions

Australasian Championships

Australian Championships

Australian Open

Notes

References

External links
Australian Open Results Archive: Mixed's Doubles

See also

Australian Open other competitions
List of Australian Open men's singles champions
List of Australian Open men's doubles champions
List of Australian Open women's singles champions
List of Australian Open women's doubles champions

Grand Slam mixed doubles
List of French Open mixed doubles champions
List of Wimbledon mixed doubles champions
List of US Open mixed doubles champions
List of Grand Slam mixed doubles champions

Mix
Australian Open
Australian Open